Robin Francis Blaser (May 18, 1925 – May 7, 2009) was an author and poet in both the United States and Canada.

Personal background
Born in Denver, Colorado, Blaser grew up in Idaho, and came to Berkeley, California, in 1944. There he met Jack Spicer and Robert Duncan, becoming a key figure in the San Francisco Renaissance of the 1950s and early 1960s. He moved to Canada in 1966, joining the faculty of Simon Fraser University; after taking early retirement in the 1980s, he held the position of professor emeritus.  He lived in the Kitsilano neighborhood of Vancouver, British Columbia.

In June 1995, for Blaser's 70th birthday, a conference was held in Vancouver to pay tribute to his contribution to Canadian poetry. The conference, known as the "Recovery of the Public World" (a phrase borrowed from Hannah Arendt), was attended by poets from around the world, including Canadian poets Michael Ondaatje, Steve McCaffery, Phyllis Webb, George Bowering, Fred Wah, Stan Persky and Daphne Marlatt; and poets who reside in the United States, including Michael Palmer and Norma Cole (who was born in Canada, subsequently migrating to San Francisco).

Blaser was also well known as the editor of The Collected Books of Jack Spicer, which includes Blaser's essay, The Practice of Outside. The 1993 publication The Holy Forest represents his collected poems to that date.

In 2006, Blaser received a special Lifetime Recognition Award given by the trustees of the Griffin Trust for Excellence in Poetry, which also awards the annual Griffin Poetry Prize. Blaser won the Prize itself in 2008.

Bibliography

Poetry
The Moth Poem, 1964
Les Chimères: Translations of Nerval for Fran Herndon, 1969
Cups, 1968
Image Nations 1-12 & The Stadium of the Mirror, 1974
Image Nations 13 & 14, Luck Unluck Oneluck, Sky-stone, Suddenly, Gathering, 1975
Harp Trees, 1977
Image Nation 15: The Lacquerhouse, 1981
Syntax, 1983
The Faerie Queene and The Park, 1987
Pell Mell, 1988
The Holy Forest, 1993
Nomad, 1995
Wanders, with Meredith Quartermain, 2002
The Holy Forest: Collected Poems of Robin Blaser, 2007  (winner of the 2008 Canadian Griffin Poetry Prize)

Essays
The Fire, 1974
The Metaphysics of Light, 1974
The Practice of Outside, 1975
The Violets: Charles Olson and Alfred North Whitehead, 1983
My Vocabulary Did This To Me, 1987
Poetry and Positivisms, 1989
The Elf of It, 1992
The Recovery of the Public World and Among Afterthoughts on This Occasion, 1993
Here Lies the Woodpecker Who Was Zeus, 1995
Thinking about Irreparables, a talk, 2000
The Fire: Collected Essays of Robin Blaser, 2006

Opera libretto
The Last Supper, the libretto for Harrison Birtwistle's opera (2000)

References

External links

Robin Blaser Homepage at the Electronic Poetry Center
Literary Encyclopedia entry
Griffin Poetry Prize biography
Griffin Poetry Prize reading, including video clip
Griffin Poetry Prize Lifetime Recognition Award
Lyric Capability: the Syntax of Robin Blaser, an essay by Meredith Quartermain
"Robyn Blaser and Friendship," a review essay by Richard Cole
MP3 files of Blaser's readings and lectures
Interview with Robin Blaser, conducted by John Sakkis
Small Press Traffic honor 
Blaser's entry in The Canadian Encyclopedia
Robin Blaser's obituary notice from poet Charles Bernstein, including Bernstein's "Afterword" to The Holy Forest: Collected Poems of Robin Blaser (2006)
"Robin Blaser, 1925-2009: Death’s Duty" by Stan Persky
‘Showing us things both marvellous and horrific' by Sandra Martin in The Globe and Mail''
Records of Robin Blaser are held by Simon Fraser University's Special Collections and Rare Books

1925 births
2009 deaths
20th-century Canadian male writers
20th-century Canadian poets
20th-century Canadian dramatists and playwrights
21st-century Canadian male writers
21st-century Canadian poets
American emigrants to Canada
American opera librettists
Canadian male poets
Canadian gay writers
Canadian LGBT poets
American LGBT poets
Poets from Colorado
Academic staff of Simon Fraser University
Writers from Berkeley, California
Writers from Denver
Writers from Idaho
Writers from Vancouver
20th-century Canadian LGBT people
Gay poets
American gay writers